Slavko Radovanović (born 24 August 1962, in Zemun) is a former Yugoslav football player, from the 1980s.

Radovanović was known mostly for playing for Red Star Belgrade and is remembered for scoring both goal and own-goal in two matches against Club Brugge in 1987–88 UEFA Cup campaign.

Slavko Radovanović spent years in France with Pau FC.

External links 
 

1962 births
Living people
People from Zemun
Footballers from Belgrade
Yugoslav footballers
Yugoslav expatriate footballers
Serbia and Montenegro footballers
Serbia and Montenegro expatriate footballers
Serbian footballers
FK Sutjeska Nikšić players
Red Star Belgrade footballers
Pau FC players
Ligue 2 players
Expatriate footballers in France
Association football defenders
Yugoslav expatriate sportspeople in France
Serbia and Montenegro expatriate sportspeople in France
Yugoslav First League players
AC Avignonnais players